Naked City: A Killer Christmas is a 1998 American film directed by Peter Bogdanovich. It was the second of two films for Showtime based on the 1948 movie The Naked City, the first being Naked City: Justice with a Bullet.

Cast
Scott Glenn as Sgt. Daniel Muldoon 
Courtney B. Vance as Officer James Halloran 
Laura Leighton as Gerry Millar 
Barbara Williams as Eva 
Nigel Bennett as Joseph Soloff
Lisa Vidal as Lori Halloran
Al Waxman as Burt

References

External links
Naked City a Killer Christmas at TCMDB
 
Review of film at Variety
Naked City A Killer Christmas at Letterbox DVD

Films directed by Peter Bogdanovich
Films scored by Hummie Mann
1998 films
1998 television films
1990s English-language films
American crime drama films
American drama television films
1990s American films